Hannelore "Loki" Schmidt (3 March 1919 – 21 October 2010) was a German teacher and environmentalist. She was the wife of Helmut Schmidt, who was the Chancellor of Germany from 1974 to 1982.

Life and work
Hannelore Glaser was born in 1919 in Hamburg. She studied four semesters of education. After graduation she worked as a school teacher continuously from 1940 until 1972 (teaching elementary school, Volksschule and Realschule). She married Helmut Schmidt in 1942. He became a politician who rose in 1974 to become Chancellor of West Germany.

In 1976, Loki Schmidt founded the Stiftung zum Schutze gefährdeter Pflanzen (engl.: foundation for the protection of endangered plants), which later became the Stiftung Naturschutz Hamburg und Stiftung zum Schutze gefährdeter Pflanzen (engl.: nature conservancy foundation Hamburg for the protection of endangered plants).

In 1980, she established the Flower of the Year campaign, a public awareness campaign for the protection of endangered wildflowers in Germany. For this work she was awarded the title Professor by the University of Hamburg. She was an honorary doctor of the Russian Academy of Science in St. Petersburg and the University of Hamburg.

The new botanical garden in Hamburg was renamed after her to "Loki-Schmidt-Garten" in 2012.

She was buried in the Ohlsdorf Cemetery.

Legacy
The Puya loki-schmidtiae, the Pitcairnia loki-schmidtiae and the scorpion Tityus lokiae are named in her honour.

Family
Loki and Helmut Schmidt married on 27 June 1942; they had one son (who died as an infant) and a daughter.

Later years
In 2009, she was awarded the honorary citizen award (Ehrenbürgerschaft)—the highest decoration—of Hamburg. She died during the night of 20/21 October 2010, aged 91, at her home in Langenhorn. The marriage with Helmut Schmidt had lasted 68 years.

Publications
Schützt die Natur: Impressionen aus unserer Heimat. Herder Verlag, 1979, .
H.-U. Reyer, W. Migongo-Buke und L. Schmidt: Field Studies and Experiments on Distribution and Foraging of Pied and Malachite Kingfishers at Lake Nakuru (Kenya). In: Journal of Animal Ecology, Band 57, 1988, S. 595–610, Zusammenfassung, .
W. Barthlott, S. Porembski, M. Kluge, J. Hopke und L. Schmidt: Selenicereus wittii (Cactaceae). An epiphyte adapted to Amazonian Igapó inundation forests. In: Plant Systematics and Evolution, Band 206, 1997, S. 175–185, .
Die Botanischen Gärten in Deutschland. Verlag Hoffmann und Campe, 1997, .
Die Blumen des Jahres. Verlag Hoffmann und Campe, 2003, .
P. Parolin, J. Adis, M. F. da Silva, I. L. do Amaral, L. Schmidt und M. T. F. Piedade: Floristic composition of a floodplain forest in the Anavilhanas archipelago, Brazilian Amazonia. In:  Amazoniana, Band 17 (3/4), 2003, S. 399–411, Abstract, .
Loki: Hannelore Schmidt erzählt aus ihrem Leben. Verlag Hoffmann und Campe, 2003, .
Mein Leben für die Schule. 2005, 
Erzähl doch mal von früher: Loki Schmidt im Gespräch mit Reinhold Beckmann. Verlag Hoffman und Campe, 2008, .

References

External links

Stiftung Naturschutz Hamburg

1919 births
2010 deaths
German environmentalists
German women environmentalists
Spouses of chancellors of Germany
People from Hamburg
Burials at the Ohlsdorf Cemetery
Helmut Schmidt